Melody Julien (born 13 May 1999) is a French long-distance runner. She competed in the women's half marathon at the 2020 World Athletics Half Marathon Championships held in Gdynia, Poland.

References

External links 
 

Living people
1999 births
Place of birth missing (living people)
French female long-distance runners
20th-century French women
21st-century French women
Athletes (track and field) at the 2022 Mediterranean Games
Mediterranean Games competitors for France